Chioninia coctei (also called Bibron's skink, the Cape Verde giant skink, Cocteau's skink, and lagarto in Portuguese) was a species of lizard that was at one time known to inhabit the islets of Branco and Raso in the Cape Verde islands of the Atlantic Ocean, islets rendered deserts by human-caused habitat destruction. None has been observed since the early 20th century, and the species was officially declared extinct in 2013.

Taxonomy
The specific name, coctei, is in honor of French physician and zoologist Jean Théodore Cocteau (1798–1838).

It has been found through mitochondrial DNA sequences that C. coctei was most closely related to the skink genus Mabuya.

Description

C. coctei was very large for a skink.

Behaviour and ecology
C. coctei was largely herbivorous, but whether out of necessity with deteriorating conditions or from opportunistic advantage, occasionally became more carnivorous as individuals would occasionally eat the young from nesting shore birds.  German herpetologists had noted Macroscincus consuming birds in captivity in the early 20th century.

One interesting aspect of this species is that it possessed a transparent lower eyelid; possibly to spot predators from below.

From the examination of preserved specimens, it appears that this species had a "belly button" slit, indicating viviparity.  However, there are also reports that indicate this species was an egg layer.

It is considered unique among the Scincidae in having tooth crowns which are labiolingually compressed and multicuspate.

It had a SENI
(Scincidae Ecological Niche Index) value of 0.13. As such, it was a partially arboreal skink that was borderline enough to adapt to the semi-desert like conditions created when the Cape Verde islands were denuded by humans and domesticated animals centuries ago.

Extinction
Causes cited for the decline of C. coctei include over hunting for food and use for "skink oil" by natives of neighboring islands and prolonged drought.  At one time, starving convicts were marooned in the Cape Verde archipelago and ate the extant population. An explorer, Leonardo Fea, brought back several specimens which are now housed in Italy.  This constitutes the extant specimens. Subsequent explorers such as Sheliech, Andreone, and Pather, have failed to find living individuals, and it has not been found since 1940. In the early 20th century, German herpetologists tried to captive-breed this species to no avail.

In the 2013.1 version of the IUCN Red List, the IUCN declared it officially extinct.

References

Bibliography
Adler GH, Austin CC, Dudley R (1995). "Dispersal and speciation of skinks among archipelagos in the tropical Pacific ocean". Evolutionary Ecology 9: 529–541. 
Austin CC (1995). "Molecular and morphological evolution in south Pacific scincid lizards: morphological conservatism and phylogenetic relationships of Papuan Lipinia (Scincidae)". Herpetologica 51: 291–300. 
Day, David (1979). Vanished Species. London: Gallery Books. pp. 254–255.
Duméril AMC, Bibron G (1839). Erpétologie générale ou Histoire naturelle complète des Reptiles. Tome cinquième. [= General Herpetology or Complete Natural History of the Reptiles. Volume 5]. Paris: Roret. viii + 854 pp. (Euprepes coctei, new species, pp. 666–668). (in French). 
Grzimek, Bernhard (1975). Grzimek's Animal Life Encyclopedia. Volume 6, Reptiles. New York: Van Nostrand- Reinhold Company. pp. 178–179 . 
Hartdegen, Ruston W. (September 2003). "The green tree skink". Reptiles Magazine (Boulder, Colorado) 11 (9): 42–50.
Honda M, Ota H, Kobayashi M, Nabhitabhata J, Yong H-S, Hikida T (1999). "Evolution of Asian and African Lygosomine Skinks of the Mabuya Group (Reptilia: Scincidae): A Molecular Perspective". Zoological Science 16 (6): 979–984.
Love, Bill (January 2003). "Mystery skink. Herpetological quiries". Reptiles Magazine 11 (1): 12. 
Pether, Jim (April 2003). "In search of Macroscincus coctei ". Reptiles Magazine 11 (4): 70–81. 
de Vosjoli, Phillippe; Fast, Frank (1995). "Account from the Daily journals of Phillippe de Vosjoli". The Vivarium (Escondido, California) 6 (5): 4–7, 12–17, 36–38, 40–44.
de Vosjoli, Phillippe; Fast, Frank (1995). "Notes from a herpetological field trip to New Caledonia (Part II) – Notes on three species of New Caledonian geckos of the Genus Rhactodactylus ". The Vivarium 6 (6): 26–29, 53–54.  
Walls, Jerry G. (1994). Skinks: identification, care, and breeding. Neptune City, New Jersey: T.F.H. Publications. pp. 52–58.

Reptile extinctions since 1500
Skinks of Africa
Vertebrates of Cape Verde
Chioninia
Reptiles described in 1839
Taxa named by André Marie Constant Duméril
Taxa named by Gabriel Bibron